Köln-Müngersdorf/Technologiepark is a railway station situated at Müngersdorf, Cologne in western Germany. The station was opened on 15 December 2002 on a section of the Cologne–Aachen railway that was opened by the Rhenish Railway Company between Cologne and Müngersdorf on 2 August 1839. The station has a partially covered island platform, which is connected by two sets of stairs and a lift to the street below, on which there is a Kölner Verkehrsbetriebe (Cologne Transport) bus stop.

The station is served by Rhine-Ruhr S-Bahn line S13 between Sindorf or Düren and Troisdorf and line S19 between Düren and Hennef (Sieg), Blankenberg (Sieg), Herchen or Au (Sieg). Together these lines provide a service every 20 minutes on weekdays and every 30 minutes on the weekend. During the peak, line S12 also provides services every 20 minutes between Horrem and Hennef (Sieg).

References 

S12 (Rhine-Ruhr S-Bahn)
Railway stations in Cologne
Rhine-Ruhr S-Bahn stations
S13 (Rhine-Ruhr S-Bahn)
Railway stations in Germany opened in 2002